Pontevedra, officially the Municipality of Pontevedra,  is a 3rd class municipality in the province of Negros Occidental, Philippines. According to the 2020 census, it has a population of 54,502 people.

The town celebrates the annual Handurayo Festival every May.

Former actress Rio Diaz served as vice mayor of the town from 1998 to 2004.

Geography
Also called Marayo, Pontevedra's center or poblacion area is marked by the newly renovated St. Michael the Archangel Parish, with the Saint Michael Academy beside it. To the east is the Public Market, ending up with Barangay Antipolo which is a notable place of some of prominent family "Hacienderos" as well as political clan of the town. The western side offers scenic views of the Panay Gulf as well as the Islands of Guimaras and Panay.

At the northern end of the town is Barangay San Juan which is named in honor of Saint John the Baptist and offers abundant turnip "singkamas" that is common in the area. Its southern part is Barangay Miranda, forming the boundary of Pontevedra and Hinigaran, where most people make their means of living through fishing.

Barangays

Pontevedra is politically subdivided into 20 barangays.

Climate

Demographics

Economy

References

External links
 [ Philippine Standard Geographic Code]
Philippine Census Information
Local Governance Performance Management System

Municipalities of Negros Occidental